Wabo may refer to:

Wabo language, a Malayo-Polynesian language of Papua, Indonesia
Charlie Wabo (born 1984), Papua New Guinean rugby league footballer
Norman Wabo (born 1998), English association footballer
WABO (AM), a radio station in Waynesboro, Mississippi
WABO-FM, a radio station in Waynesboro, Mississippi

See also
Cabo Wabo, a nightclub and restaurant in Cabo San Lucas, Mexico